Two Ocean Pass is a mountain pass on North America's Continental Divide, in the Teton Wilderness, which is part of Wyoming's Bridger-Teton National Forest. The pass is notable for Parting of the Waters, where one stream, North Two Ocean Creek, splits into two distributaries, Pacific Creek and Atlantic Creek, at Parting of the Waters National Natural Landmark.  These two creeks ultimately flow into their respective oceans.  Atlantic Creek water eventually flows into the Yellowstone River and empties into the Gulf of Mexico via the Missouri River and Mississippi River. Pacific Creek water eventually flows into the Snake River and empties into the Pacific via the Columbia River.

Recreation
The Continental Divide Trail reaches this location in northern Wyoming. It is accessible by foot or horseback from the south via Brooks Lake Trail head off of Highway 287 or from the north via an extensive hike from Fox Park near Yellowstone National Park's southern border.

Fish dispersal
The pass is thought to have provided access for the Yellowstone cutthroat trout to have colonized Yellowstone Lake and the rest of the Yellowstone River watershed above Lower Falls. Similarly, it has been considered as an alternative explanation for the arrival of non-native lake trout in Yellowstone Lake, which has traditionally been attributed to illegal or accidental stocking.

Gallery

References

External links 
Two Ocean Pass National Natural Landmark, National Park Service website. 

Mountain passes of Wyoming
National Natural Landmarks in Wyoming
Great Divide of North America
Protected areas of Teton County, Wyoming
Bridger–Teton National Forest
Mountain passes of Teton County, Wyoming